Central Library is a public library in Blackpool, Lancashire, England. The building that contains the library and the Grundy Art Gallery has been designated a Grade II listed building by English Heritage.

History
In 1908, a site was picked for a new library and art gallery on Queen Street. It was partly financed by Bury artists Cuthbert and John Grundy. Construction started on the building in 1909, and it was completed in 1911. It was designed by Scottish architecture firm Cullen, Lochhead and Brown, who had won a competition for the project. In August 2010, the library closed to the public to undergo a year-long renovation that cost £3 million. It reopened on 26 September 2011. The Library celebrated its centenary on 26 October 2011.

Architecture
The library is in the Edwardian Baroque style. It is on two storeys and is constructed of red brick with stone dressings and striped pilasters. The library occupies the corner part of the building; the west and south walls have flanking pylons on plinths made of stone. The corner entrance is flanked by three ionic columns on each side. Over the doorway is a large, rectangular window, and above that, a frieze carved with the words "". At the top, there is an octagonal leaded dome, which has a finial shaped like an urn.

On 20 October 1983 the building that contains the library, and the adjacent Grundy Art Gallery, was designated a Grade II listed building by Historic England. The Grade II listing—the lowest of the three grades—is for buildings that are "nationally important and of special interest".

Stained Glass
As part of the centenary renovation of the building in 2011, 8 new stained glass windows were commissioned.  Designed by Nick Robertson with a brief from the staff of the Library and input from Library users which were made by Rainbow Glass Studios based in London.

See also
Listed buildings in Blackpool

References
Footnotes

Sources

Library buildings completed in 1911
Blackpool Central Library
Central Library
Blackpool Central Library
Blackpool Central Library